Calliostoma oregon, common name the Oregon Atlantic top shell, is a species of sea snail, a marine gastropod mollusk in the family Calliostomatidae.

Description
The height of the shell attains 21 mm.

Distribution
This species occurs in the Gulf of Mexico at depths between 206 m and 350 m.

References

 Clench, W. J. and R. D. Turner. 1960. The genus Calliostoma in the Western Atlantic. Johnsonia 4: 1–80
 Rosenberg, G., F. Moretzsohn, and E. F. García. 2009. Gastropoda (Mollusca) of the Gulf of Mexico, pp. 579–699 in Felder, D.L. and D.K. Camp (eds.), Gulf of Mexico–Origins, Waters, and Biota. Biodiversity. Texas A&M Press, College Station, Texas.

External links

oregon
Gastropods described in 1960